Prunus canescens, the gray-leaf cherry (and hoary cherry, although that name is also used for Prunus incana), is a species of cherry native to China, found in Hubei and Sichuan provinces. A shrubby tree, it grows to about 3m. It is a parent of a number of hybrid rootstocks for sweet cherries, and occasionally grown as an ornamental for its attractive shiny brown bark.

Hybrids
Hybrids having P. canescens as a parent include Prunus × schmittii (P. avium × P. canescens), an ornamental tree, and the important GiSeLa dwarfing rootstock series (P. cerasus × P. canescens).

References

External links

 

canescens
Cherries
Flora of China
Ornamental trees
Plants described in 1904